was a Japanese photographer. He is particularly well known for his book Himalayas, published by Harry N. Abrams in 1971.

Bibliography
Himalayas, preface by Arnold Toynbee & preface by Sir Edmund Hillary. New York: Harry N. Abrams (1971) 
The Alps, text translated by Max A. Wyss, introduction by Chris Bonington. London: Thames and Hudson (1973) 
(Translated from the German edition, Majestät der Alpen, by J. Maxwell Brownjohn)

References

External links
 Official Website

1935 births
2022 deaths
Japanese photographers
People from Ehime Prefecture
Recipients of the Medal with Purple Ribbon